Copper City is an unincorporated community in Glenn County, California located in the Mendocino National Forest. It lies at an elevation of 5837 feet (1779 m).
Copper ore was discovered along mountain creeks in this area during the 1860s, creating an influx of miners with "Copper Fever" to this remote site in the eastern Coastal Mountain Range. The mining community dissipated nearly as quickly as it sprung up, and nothing remains of it today other than the place name.

References

Unincorporated communities in California
Unincorporated communities in Glenn County, California